Michael James Tomlinson-Mynors  (born 1 October 1977) is a British politician serving as Solicitor General for England and Wales since September 2022. He served as Vice-Chamberlain of the Household from July to September 2022. He has been the Member of Parliament (MP) for Mid Dorset and North Poole since 2015. A member of the Conservative Party, he served as Deputy Chairman of the European Research Group (ERG) from 20 November 2016 until 19 March 2018.

Early life
Tomlinson was educated at Hereford Cathedral School and graduated from King's College London with a BA in Classics before studying for a Postgraduate Diploma in Law at the College of Law and becoming a barrister at Middle Temple. He was awarded the Queen Mother Scholarship and represented Middle Temple in international mooting competitions in the United States and Hong Kong.

Parliamentary career 
Tomlinson has represented the constituency of Mid Dorset and North Poole since the 2015 General Election. He lists his main areas of interest as education, employment, infrastructure and justice. He made his maiden speech in the House of Commons on 22 June 2015 during a debate on the Education and Adoption Bill.

He voted for the UK to hold a referendum on continued membership of the European Union and he subsequently supported the campaign to leave the European Union. The referendum itself was held in June 2016. Subsequently, between November 2016 and May 2017 and then again between October 2017 and November 2019, Tomlinson was a member of the European Scrutiny Committee.

Tomlinson was appointed Parliamentary Private Secretary to the ministers at the Department of International Development in July 2017 and was promoted to Parliamentary Private Secretary to the Secretary of State, Penny Mordaunt, in January 2018. He had previously been involved in pro bono legal projects in Rwanda and Sierra Leone. He was appointed Parliamentary Private Secretary to Dominic Raab, Secretary of State for Exiting the European Union in November 2018, less than 48 hours before the latter resigned from the Cabinet. Shortly thereafter Tomlinson wrote an article in The Daily Telegraph, in which he expressed reservations about the terms of the agreement to withdraw from the European Union negotiated by Theresa May.

In February 2020, Tomlinson was appointed a Lord Commissioner of the Treasury, making him a government whip.

In September 2022, he was appointed Solicitor General for England and Wales by Liz Truss and in October 2022 he was reappointed by Rishi Sunak. On 4 November 2022, he was appointed King's Counsel making him the first person appointed under a King's reign for over 70 years.

Personal life 
In May 1997, Tomlinson made one appearance in Minor County Cricket, playing for Herefordshire against Dorset, when he did not bat or bowl. He is currently a member of the Lords and Commons Cricket Club. He is married to wife Frances, and they have three children.

References

External links

|-

1977 births
Living people
People educated at Hereford Cathedral School
Alumni of King's College London
British barristers
English King's Counsel
21st-century King's Counsel
Conservative Party (UK) MPs for English constituencies
UK MPs 2015–2017
UK MPs 2017–2019
UK MPs 2019–present
Herefordshire cricketers
English cricketers
Solicitors General for England and Wales